"I'll Keep Loving You" is a song by French DJ and producer David Guetta, taken from his sixth studio album, Listen. It features vocals from Jaymes Young and Birdy. It was released, along with the album, on 24 November 2014. The song is a piano ballad, a musical departure for Guetta, and is a duet between Birdy and Young. It is the second to last track on the standard version of the album, and helped slow the album down towards an end. It is built over a strong piano melody, drums, and minimal synths. Birdy and Young have collaborated many times before and after the song was done. It has charted in Germany and France.

Composition
The song is the second to last track on the album, placed accurately in the album, bringing it to a slow ending. The song is an emotional ballad, which features lyrics showing the two singers being affectionate of each other, while also insulting themselves and each other, such as "You are cruel, you are," sung by Young in the first verse and "You are so wild," sung by Birdy in the second verse. Young sings the first verse, and Birdy sings the second verse, and they both sing the hook and bridge. The song features a brief drop, at the beginning of the song, when drums are played, then a piano comes in, and synths accompany it.

Charts

References

David Guetta songs
Birdy (singer) songs
2014 songs
Songs written by Frédéric Riesterer
Songs written by Giorgio Tuinfort
Songs written by David Guetta
Songs written by Matt Dragstrem
Song recordings produced by David Guetta
2010s ballads